The women's 3000 metres race of the 2014–15 ISU Speed Skating World Cup 4, arranged in the Thialf arena in Heerenveen, Netherlands, was held on 12 December 2014.

Martina Sáblíková of the Czech Republic won, followed by Ireen Wüst of the Netherlands in second place, and Carlijn Achtereekte of the Netherlands in third place. Ida Njåtun of Norway won Division B.

Results
The race took place on Friday, 12 December, with Division B scheduled in the morning session, at 13:34, and Division A scheduled in the afternoon session, at 16:00.

Division A

Division B

References

Women 3000
4